Arroyo Point is the northeast extremity of a trapezoid-shaped and mostly ice-covered headland projecting 900 m from the east coast of Ioannes Paulus II Peninsula into Hero Bay, Livingston Island in the South Shetland Islands, Antarctica. The point forms the south side of the entrance to Stoyanov Cove and, together with nearby Agüero Point, separates the termini of Urdoviza Glacier to the north from Medven Glacier to the south.

The feature is named after Jesús Arroyo, a crewman of the Argentine Navy Lockheed Neptune aircraft that crashed in poor weather on the slopes of Mount Friesland on 15 September 1976.

Location

See also
 Ioannes Paulus II Peninsula
 Livingston Island

Maps
 L. Ivanov et al. Antarctica: Livingston Island and Greenwich Island, South Shetland Islands. Scale 1:100000 topographic map. Sofia: Antarctic Place-names Commission of Bulgaria, 2005.
 L. Ivanov. Antarctica: Livingston Island and Greenwich, Robert, Snow and Smith Islands. Scale 1:120000 topographic map.  Troyan: Manfred Wörner Foundation, 2009.  
 L. Ivanov. Antarctica: Livingston Island and Smith Island. Scale 1:100000 topographic map. Manfred Wörner Foundation, 2017.

References
 Cabo Arroyo. SCAR Composite Antarctic Gazetteer

Headlands of Livingston Island